The Mid-Western Junior Hockey League (MWJHL) was a junior ice hockey league in Ontario, Canada, sanctioned by the Ontario Hockey Association from 1973 until 2007.  In 2007, the league became a division of the newly formed Greater Ontario Junior Hockey League along with the Western Ontario Hockey League and Golden Horseshoe Junior Hockey League.

Southwestern Junior "B" Hockey League 1973 - 1974
Waterloo-Wellington Junior "B" Hockey League 1974 - 1977
Mid-Western Junior "B" Hockey League 1977 - 2007

History
The Mid-Western "B" was known as the Waterloo-Wellington Junior "B" Hockey League until 1977 when it donned its current name.  Before 1974, the league was known as the Southwestern Junior "B" Hockey League for one season.  The league was founded in 1973, taking aboard Kitchener Ranger Bs, Waterloo Siskins from the Western Jr. B league, and expansion teams the Caledonia Corvairs and Brantford Diamond Kings.  A year later the Stratford Warriors joined the Waterloo-Wellington league, along with the Preston Raiders, Hespeler Shamrocks and Elmira Sugar Kings.

As there is little information about the league pre-1977, it is easy to say that the Mid-Western "B" was easily dominated by the Stratford Cullitons and the Waterloo Siskins for the first fourteen years of its current existence. Stratford won 8 championships in the league's early years, with Waterloo close behind with 6, but all other charter members were left without glory until the Kitchener Dutchmen won their first championship in 1992.  Since then, the Cullitons have won 5 league championships and the Siskins have won only once, making way for other teams like the Elmira Sugar Kings, the Dutchmen, and the Cambridge Winterhawks.

In 2007, the MWJHL merged with the Western Ontario Hockey League and the Golden Horseshoe Junior Hockey League to create the Greater Ontario Junior Hockey League.

2007-08 season
For information on the 2007-08 season, please see: Greater Ontario Junior Hockey League.

Final teams
These are the teams that were in the league during its final independent season (2006-07).
Brantford Golden Eagles
Cambridge Winterhawks
Elmira Sugar Kings
Guelph Dominators
Kitchener Dutchmen
Listowel Cyclones
Owen Sound Greys
Stratford Cullitons
Waterloo Siskins

Other former members
Brantford Diamond Kings
Caledonia Corvairs
Guelph Holody Platers
New Hamburg Hahns
Orangeville Crushers
Preston Raiders

Cherrey Cup Playoff Champions

Records
Taken from league 25th Anniversary Program.
Best record: 1985-86 Stratford Cullitons (36-3-1)
Worst record: 1997-98 Ohsweken Golden Eagles (0-47-1)
Largest margin of victory: Waterloo Siskins 23 - Listowel Cyclones 3 on December 11, 1983
Most goals, one season: Jason Mervyn (79) -- 1991-92 Stratford Cullitons
Most assists, one season: Dan Haylow (98) -- 1989-90 Owen Sound Greys
Most points, one season: Erik Anderson (145) -- 1996-97 Stratford Cullitons
Most goals, career: Ron White (163) -- 143 games with the Stratford Cullitons
Most assists, career: Jamie Hartnett (212) -- 188 games with Stratford Cullitons
Most points, career: Jamie Hartnett (371) -- 188 games with Stratford Cullitons
Most penalty minutes, season: Chris Brine (398) -- 1993-94 Cambridge Winterhawks
Lowest goals against average, one season: Greg Dreveny (1.96) -- 1988-89 Waterloo Siskins
Most shutouts, one season: Matt Barnes (6) -- 1993-94 Stratford Cullitons

External links
Midwestern Junior B Website
OHA Website
Pointstreak

Defunct ice hockey leagues in Ontario